The Topaz Magno is a Sailing dinghy created by Topper International designed for between 1 and 4 crew members, though usually 2.

Performance and design
The Magno is a versatile three-sail boat that is great as either a small family boat or for club racing or teaching. The spacious cockpit with its gnav kicker (an upside down vang)  offers roomy and comfortable sailing and is an ideal teaching platform for groups. The boat can be sailed single-handedly due to the zip-reefing system in the mainsail adding yet another layer of versatility.

The Magno is a dinghy that can be used for learning to sail, to club racing. The Magno, a mid-sized dinghy of the topper range, is a good boat for youth training, being stable with plenty of room for two trainees and an instructor. The boat has a Gnav kicker system which gives you more room in the cockpit.

References

External links
 Topper International - Magno

Dinghies
Sailboat types built by Topper International